Giresse is a French surname. Notable people with the surname include:

Alain Giresse (born 1952), French footballer and manager
Thibault Giresse (born 1981), French footballer, son of Alain

French-language surnames